Trainbands or Trained Bands were companies of militia in England or the Americas, first organized in the 16th century and dissolved in the 18th. The term was used after this time to describe the London militia.  In the early American colonies the trainband was the most basic tactical unit. However, no standard company size existed and variations were wide.  As population grew these companies were organized into regiments to allow better management.  But trainbands were not combat units.  Generally, upon reaching a certain age a man was required to join the local trainband in which he received periodic training for the next couple of decades.  In wartime, military forces were formed by selecting men from trainbands on an individual basis and then forming them into a fighting unit.

The exact derivation and usage is not clear.  A nineteenth-century dictionary says, under "Train":

The issue is whether the men "received training" in the modern sense, or whether they were "in the train" or retinue or were otherwise organized around a military "train" as in horse-drawn artillery.

In 17th Century New England colonial militia units were usually referred to as "train bands" or, sometimes, "trained bands".  Typically, each town would elect three officers to lead its train band with the ranks of captain, lieutenant and ensign.  As the populations of towns varied widely, larger towns usually had more than one train band.  In the middle 1600s train bands began to be referred to as companies.

On December 13, 1636 the Massachusetts Militia was organized into three regiments - North, South and East.  As there are National Guard units descendants of these regiments, this date is used as the "birthday" of the National Guard, despite the fact that citizen militias in the American Colonies date back to the Jamestown settlement in 1607.

References

External links
 

Infantry units and formations
Militia in the United States
Militia of the United Kingdom